Padre Placido Puccinelli (1609–1685) was a Cassinese monk, historian and scholar. He was born at Pescia and educated at the abbey of S. Maria in Florence. He began his monastic career on 15 January 1626. For a long time, he was itinerant, travelling between the cities of northern Italy. At one time he was a master of novices at Gessate. He frequented the then-young Ambrosian Library in Milan, founded by Cardinal Federico Borromeo. He died in the Badia Fiorentina in Florence. 

Puccinelli was interested in historical studies, but above all genealogy and prosopography, in which the abbey had a tradition. He modelled his style after that of the historian of Lucca, Francesco Maria Fiorentini, whom he befriended. Another scholarly friendship was with Pietro Puricelli. Like Puricelli he wrote on the history of the Humiliati.

Works
Cronica della Badia Fiorentina (1645)
Istoria delle eroiche azioni della gran dama Willa (1663) 
Memorie di Pescia (1664)
Istoria delle eroiche azioni di Ugo il Grande (1664)

Notes

1609 births
1685 deaths
17th-century Italian historians
Italian Christian monks